William Thomas Mollison (1816 – 9 November 1886) was an pastoralist and politician in colonial Victoria, a member of the Victorian Legislative Council and later, the Victorian Legislative Assembly.

Early life
Mollison was born in London, England, the son of Crawford Mollison and Elizabeth, née Fullerton

Colonial Australia
Mollison arrived in the Port Phillip District in 1838 to join his brother, Alexander Fullerton Mollison.

On 8 June 1853 Mollison was elected to the unicameral Victorian Legislative Council for Talbot, Dalhousie and Anglesey, a seat he held until the original Council was abolished in March 1856. Mollison was elected to the seat of Dundas and Follett in the Victorian Legislative Assembly in April 1858. The seat was known as Dundas from 1859, Mollison held the seat until resigning in February 1864.

Mollison died in England on 9 November 1886.

References

 

1816 births
1886 deaths
Members of the Victorian Legislative Assembly
Members of the Victorian Legislative Council
People from London
English emigrants to colonial Australia
19th-century Australian politicians